was a Japanese professional sumo wrestler from Oita Prefecture. Entering sumo in 1927, he was the sport's 35th yokozuna from 1937 until his retirement in 1945. He won twelve yūshō or top division championships and had a winning streak of 69 consecutive bouts, an all-time record. Despite his dominance he was extremely popular with the public. After his retirement he was head coach of Tokitsukaze stable and chairman of the Japan Sumo Association.

Career
Born  in Usa, he worked on fishing boats as young boy. He joined professional sumo in March 1927 at the age of 15, recruited by Tatsunami stable. He entered the top makuuchi division at the beginning of 1932. He was promoted from the middle of the second jūryō division to maegashira 4, as many top division wrestlers had just gone on strike (the so-called "Shunjūen Incident"), and the Japan Sumo Association needed to fill the gaps in the ranks. However, he soon proved himself worthy of the promotion, finishing as runner-up in his second top division tournament.

Futabayama is particularly remembered for achieving the longest run of consecutive victories in sumo bouts, with 69, a record that still stands today.  This represents an unbeaten run which stretched over three years. In a sport where matches often last a few seconds, and a brief lapse in concentration can lead to a loss, this is an exceptional achievement. It began on January 7, 1936 at the rank of sekiwake. During this run he was promoted from maegashira 3 to yokozuna. It generated such excitement among the public that the Sumo Association extended the number of days per tournament from 11 to 13, and then to 15. He was finally defeated on January 3, 1939 by maegashira Akinoumi (later a yokozuna himself). He lost more to illness than to a superior opponent, as he was suffering from amoebic dysentery at the time.

Futabayama won a total of twelve tournament championships, during a period in which there were only two tournaments held each year. His total remained a record until the number of tournaments was increased to six a year in the 1950s. However, the percentage of championships won in his makuuchi career still compares favorably to the wrestlers who have surpassed his total in the six tournament a year era.

After his retirement Futabayama revealed he was actually blind in one eye, due to an injury suffered in his youth, making his achievements even more remarkable.

He was one of the first top wrestlers to break away from the tradition of marrying his stablemaster's daughter, instead choosing a young heiress from a rich Kansai family. Their reception was held in April 1939 at the Tokyo Kaikan. (His coach's daughter married Haguroyama instead.)

Fighting style
Futabayama was noted for being exceptionally good at the initial phase of a sumo match, the tachi-ai. He was an expert at the gonosen no tachiai or receiving his opponent's charge and immediately countering it. He is believed to have never made a false start. Although he was not particularly large, he had excellent balance. One of his most feared techniques was uwatenage, or overarm throw.

Retirement from sumo

The June 1945 tournament was held in a bomb-damaged Kokugikan with barely any spectators, and Futabayama dropped out after the first day. He did not take part in the November 1945 tournament and announced his retirement during it, claiming that he objected to the newly enlarged dohyō that the Sumo Association had introduced at the behest of the American occupying authorities. However, he had actually made a decision to retire a year earlier, having suffered a loss to Azumafuji, another future yokozuna.

Futabayama had become head of his own stable, Futabayama Dojo, in 1941 whilst still an active wrestler (a practice now forbidden), and upon his retirement he adopted the Tokitsukaze elder name and renamed his heya Tokitsukaze stable. It grew to become one of sumo's largest stables by the 1950s, and Futabayama produced several strong wrestlers including yokozuna Kagamisato and ōzeki Kitabayama and Yutakayama.  He remained in charge of the stable until his death from hepatitis in 1968. From 1957 he was also chairman (rijichō) of the Japan Sumo Association. In his time as chairman he introduced a number of important reforms, such as giving monthly salaries to wrestlers ranked in the top two divisions, and enforcing a mandatory retirement age of 65 for elders and referees.

Career record

Four tournaments a year, in Tokyo and other locations, were held from 1927–1932. For most of the 1930s and 1940s only two tournaments were held a year in Tokyo only.

See also
List of sumo record holders
List of sumo tournament top division champions
List of yokozuna
Glossary of sumo terms
List of past sumo wrestlers

References

External links 

 Futabayama Sadaji

1912 births
1968 deaths
Japanese sumo wrestlers
Sumo people from Ōita Prefecture
Yokozuna
Recipients of the Medal with Purple Ribbon
Deaths from hepatitis
Infectious disease deaths in Japan